Daniel Stauber is an American former ice hockey player and coach who was the NCAA Division III coach of the year.

Career
Stauber's college career began in 1984 with Wisconsin–Superior. Unfortunately, during his four years as a player, the Yellowjackets never finished with a winning record. After graduating, Stauber briefly played professional hockey in Sweden before retiring in 1989. He remained with the game, becoming an assistant coach at Wisconsin–Eau Claire shortly thereafter. In the mid-90's he became the head coach at Waupaca High School and later his alma mater, Denfeld High School.

Stauber was lured back to Wisconsin–Superior in 1998 as an assistant coach. He served under his former coach, Steve Nelson, for two seasons before being named as his replacement in 2000. While Nelson had led Wisconsin–Superior to the frozen four in seven of the previous nine seasons, the team had been unable to win the championship. In Stauber's first season as head coach, that trend continued; while he led the program to its first ever 30-win season, UWS was defeated by Plattsburgh State in the national semifinal. A year later, however, Stauber finally got his team to reach the promised land when they downed the Norwich Cadets 3–2 in overtime to win their first NCAA national championship. Stauber was named as the national coach of the year for his efforts.

The team declined a bit after the championship, but Stauber continued to lead them to positive results for many years afterwards. The Yellowjackets made two more appearances in the NCAA tournament but, by the 2010s, they had fallen down in the standings. During his tenure as head coach, Stauber went back to class and earned a Master's in education. In 2016, Stauber stepped down as head coach a little more than a year after setting the program record for the most wins behind the bench. He returned to the high school ranks with Proctor High School, serving as the boys ice hockey couch for four seasons before hanging up his whistle in 2020 and working as a teacher thereafter.

Personal life
Stauber's three brothers all played college hockey. Jamie attended Wisconsin–Eau Claire in the early 80's, Pete won a Division I national championship at Lake Superior State and Robb won the Hobey Baker Award while attending Minnesota before embarking on a career in the NHL.

Towards the end of his tenure at Wisconsin–Superior, Dan coached his son Owen with the Yellowjackets. He also had several nephews play college hockey, including Jaxson, Levi and Willy.

Statistics

Regular season and playoffs

Head coaching record

College

References

External links

Year of birth missing (living people)
American ice hockey coaches
American men's ice hockey players
Living people
Ice hockey people from Minnesota
Wisconsin–Superior Yellowjackets men's ice hockey players
Wisconsin–Superior Yellowjackets men's ice hockey coaches